
Year 645 (DCXLV) was a common year starting on Saturday (link will display the full calendar) of the Julian calendar. The denomination 645 for this year has been used since the early medieval period, when the Anno Domini calendar era became the prevalent method in Europe for naming years.

Events 
 By place 
 Byzantine Empire 
 Alexandria revolts against Arab rule, at the appearance of a Byzantine fleet of 300 ships, and Byzantine forces recapture the city. Abdullah ibn Sa'ad, Arab governor of Egypt, mounts an assault and retakes it. He begins building a Muslim fleet.

 Europe 
 Plato, exarch (imperial governor) of Ravenna, invades the southern Po Valley. The Lombards under King Rothari defeat him on the banks of the Panaro River (near Modena); 8,000 imperial troops are killed.

 Britain 
 King Cenwalh of Wessex is driven from his kingdom by his brother-in-law, King Penda of Mercia (according to Bede). He flees to the court of king Anna of East Anglia, and is baptised while in exile. Penda overruns Wessex.
 Gwynedd and much of Wales is in the grasp of famine. Would-be king Cadwaladr Fendigaid flees to Brittany. Civil war continues in his kingdom (approximate date).

 Japan 
 July 10 – Isshi Incident: Prince Naka-no-Ōe and Fujiwara no Kamatari assassinate Soga no Iruka, during a coup d'état at the imperial palace.
 Empress Kōgyoku is forced to abdicate the throne in favor of her younger brother Kōtoku, age 49, who becomes the 36th emperor of Japan.
 Naka-no-Ōe becomes crown prince and prime minister. Supporters of the semi-legendary regent Prince Shōtoku gain supremacy in Japan.
 Emperor Kōtoku establishes the Taika Reform: a land reform based on Confucian ideas and philosophies from China (approximate date).
 Kōtoku creates a new city at Naniwa, and moves the capital from Yamato Province. The capital has a sea port, establishing foreign trade and diplomatic relations.

 China 
 May 1 – First conflict of the Goguryeo–Tang War: A Chinese expeditionary army under Emperor Taizong of Tang crosses the Liao River into Goguryeo (one of the Three kingdoms of Korea).
 July 18 – Tang forces under Li Shiji heading southeast toward the Yalu River put the strategic fortress of Ansi City (in the province of Liaoning) under siege.
 September – Taizong is unable to capture the Ansi fortress defended by Korean general Yang Manchun. Food supplies running low, he withdraws his forces, ending the Siege of Ansi.
 October 13 – Emperor Taizong is compelled to order a withdrawal from Goguryeo.

 By topic 
 Religion 
 Xuanzang, Chinese Buddhist monk, returns to China after a 16-year pilgrimage to India. He is greeted with much honor by Emperor Taizong.
 The Giant Wild Goose Pagoda at Ci'en Temple, Xi'an (Shanxi) is first erected during the Tang dynasty (approximate date).

Births 
 Æthelred, king of Mercia (approximate date)
 Ecgfrith, king of Northumbria (approximate date)
 Jitō, empress of Japan (d. 703)
 John of Damascus, Syrian church father (or 676)
 Mujahid ibn Jabr, Arabic scholar (or 642)
 Yazid I, Muslim Caliph (d. 683)

Deaths 
 April 26 – Richarius, Frankish hermit and monk
 July 10 – Soga no Iruka, statesman of Japan
 October 21 – Zhenzhu Khan, khan of Xueyantuo
unknown dates
 Al-Khansa, Arabic poet (b. 575)
 Cen Wenben, chancellor and editor of the Book of Zhou (b. 595)
 Li Chengqian, crown prince of the Tang Dynasty
 Soga no Emishi, statesman of Japan (b. 587)
 Yan Shigu, Chinese author of the Tang Dynasty (b. 581)

References

Sources